Terence Darea Morris (born January 11, 1979) is an American former professional basketball player. He was twice the Israeli Basketball Premier League Defensive Player of the Year, in 2007 and 2008. He was an All-EuroLeague First Team selection in 2008.

High school career 
Terence Morris played his high school basketball for Governor Thomas Johnson High School in Frederick, Maryland, leading the TJ Patriots to the Maryland Class 3A state title as a senior in 1997. He played under former TJ Patriots coach Tom Dickman, who until recently was the record holder for wins by a public school coach in Maryland with 592 wins in 29 seasons.

College career
A  forward from the University of Maryland, College Park, Morris was hailed as one of the best prospects in all of college basketball after his sophomore season in 1998–99. But while the consensus was that he would have been a Top-5 pick in the 1999 NBA draft had he left school after that year along with teammate Steve Francis, Morris instead opted to return to Maryland for his junior and senior seasons, and his draft stock dropped after two less individually successful campaigns. Morris helped play Maryland to the first Final Four in school history during the 2001 NCAA Men's Division I Basketball Tournament to cap his senior season.

Professional career

NBA

Morris was eventually selected by the Atlanta Hawks with the 33rd pick of the 2001 NBA draft, and his draft rights were immediately traded to the Houston Rockets, with whom he played two seasons (2001–2003). He then spent the 2003–04 season in the NBDL with the Columbus Riverdragons (now known as the Austin Spurs), and signed with the Los Angeles Clippers in September, 2004, but was waived before the season started. He signed with the Orlando Magic in September 2005. He earned a roster spot for the remainder of the season, but was again waived in February 2006.

Morris' final NBA game was played on February 14, 2006 in a 93 - 107 loss to the Miami Heat where Morris only played for 37 seconds and recorded no stats.

Europe

After being waived by the Los Angeles Clippers in 2004, he decided to move to Europe and signed with Apollon Patras of the Greek League.

Morris began the 2006–07 season unaffiliated to a team, but in December 2006, he signed with the Israeli League club Hapoel Jerusalem until the end of the season. With Hapoel he won an Israeli State Cup.

On June 13, 2007, he signed with the EuroLeague club Maccabi Tel Aviv. He was twice the Israeli Basketball Premier League Defensive Player of the Year, in 2007 and 2008. On May 3, 2008, Morris won a place in the 2007–08 All-EuroLeague First team as a result of his play and the fact that his team reached the EuroLeague Final.

He then transferred to the Russian Super League club CSKA Moscow and he reached another EuroLeague competition final in the 2008–09 season. In 2009, he joined the Spanish ACB League club FC Barcelona, with whom he won his first EuroLeague competition in 2010. He left Barcelona after two seasons, and announced his retirement.

NBA career statistics

Regular season 

|-
| align="left" | 2001–02
| align="left" | Houston
| 68 || 12 || 16.3 || .384 || .192 || .643 || 3.1 || .9 || .3 || .4 || 3.8
|-
| align="left" | 2002–03
| align="left" | Houston
| 49 || 0 || 12.9 || .466 || .219 || .786 || 2.6 || .5 || .2 || .3 || 3.7
|-
| align="left" | 2005–06
| align="left" | Orlando
| 22 || 0 || 8.7 || .327 || .000 || 1.000 || 1.7 || .2 || .3 || .2 || 1.6
|-
| align="left" | Career
| align="left" |
| 139 || 12 || 13.9 || .407 || .196 || .711 || 2.7 || .7 || .3 || .4 || 3.4

References

External links
Euroleague.net Profile
NBA.com Profile
NBA Stats @ Basketball-reference.com
Draftexpress.com Profile
Terence Morris NBA Historical Player Profile @ NBA.com

1979 births
Living people
African-American basketball players
American expatriate basketball people in Greece
American expatriate basketball people in Israel
American expatriate basketball people in Russia
American expatriate basketball people in Spain
American men's basketball players
Apollon Patras B.C. players
Atlanta Hawks draft picks
Basketball players from Maryland
Columbus Riverdragons players
FC Barcelona Bàsquet players
Greek Basket League players
Hapoel Jerusalem B.C. players
Houston Rockets players
Israeli Basketball Premier League players
Liga ACB players
Maccabi Tel Aviv B.C. players
Maryland Terrapins men's basketball players
Orlando Magic players
Parade High School All-Americans (boys' basketball)
PBC CSKA Moscow players
Power forwards (basketball)
Small forwards
Sportspeople from Frederick, Maryland
21st-century African-American sportspeople
20th-century African-American sportspeople